"I'll Always Be In Love With You" is a 1929 popular song written by Herman Ruby, Bud Green, and Sam H. Stept for the film Syncopation. The song soon became a hit, with a recording in that year by Fred Waring and His Pennsylvanians charting for 8 weeks, peaking at No. 3. Another recording from that year by Morton Downey charted as well, reaching No. 9. The song has since been recorded many times by artists including Ella Fitzgerald, Benny Goodman, Count Basie, Helen Forrest, Fletcher Henderson, Dinah Shore, and Kay Starr.

References 

1929 songs
Traditional pop songs
1929 in music
Songs with lyrics by Bud Green
Songs with music by Sam H. Stept